John Connolly may refer to:

John Connolly (author) (born 1968), Irish author whose best-known novels revolve around former policeman Charlie Parker
John Connolly (bishop) (1750–1825), Irish-born second bishop of New York
John Connolly (blogger), Irish blogger and activist responsible for critically damaging the presidential campaign of Irish Senator David Norris
John Connolly (FBI) (born 1940), American imprisoned former FBI agent
John Connolly (hurler) (born 1948), retired Irish hurler
John Connolly (Irish footballer) (born 1971), Irish footballer
John Connolly (loyalist) (1741–1813), American doctor from Pennsylvania, agent of John Murray, 4th Earl of Dunmore, active during the American Revolution
John Connolly (musician) (born 1968), American musician with Sevendust
John Connolly (rugby union coach) (born 1951), Australian former head coach of the Australia national rugby union team
John Connolly (Scottish footballer) (born 1950), Scottish football player and manager
John Joseph Connolly (1906–1982), Canadian parliamentarian and law professor
John L. Connolly (1871–1933), Canadian merchant and political figure in Nova Scotia, Canada
John Patrick Connolly (1894–1971), American politician convicted of bribery
John P. Connolly (businessman) (born 1950), British Chairman of Deloitte
John R. Connolly (born 1973), American city councillor at-large of Boston, Massachusetts
John W. Connolly (1911–1981), 46th Lieutenant Governor of Michigan

See also
John Connally (1917–1993), American Governor of Texas from 1963 to 1969
Johnny Connolly, Irish folk musician
Johnny Óg Connolly, Irish folk musician, son of the above
John Connelly (disambiguation)
Jack Connolly (disambiguation)
John Conolly (disambiguation)
John Conlee (born 1946), American country music singer